Adungrella is a genus of harvestmen in the family Sclerosomatidae.

Species
 Adungrella aenea Roewer, 1955
 Adungrella atrorubra Suzuki, 1967
 Adungrella punctulata Roewer, 1955

References

Harvestman genera
Sclerosomatidae